Jorge Hauser is a Mexican film producer and underwater photographer. He produced the documentary México Pelágico. He has photographed sharks, and has been active in the promotion of ecotourism.

References

External links

 https://web.archive.org/web/20150522130554/http://www.wired.com/2015/05/jorge-hauser-fish-say-cheese/
 https://web.archive.org/web/20080801153904/http://www.barrontv.co.uk/unearthed_students.htm
 http://www.discoverychannel.co.uk/animalplanet/unearthed/index.shtml
 https://web.archive.org/web/20080922024517/http://www.andrewbarron.com/id64.htm
 https://web.archive.org/web/20080825045553/http://www.anahuac.mx/noticias/1262.html
 http://www.expedition.sk/index.php?page=discovery02
 https://web.archive.org/web/20150402211913/http://tedxsanmigueldeallende.com/en/2014-speakers/jorge-cervera-hauser/

Mexican documentary filmmakers
Living people
Year of birth missing (living people)